The 1940 Purdue Boilermakers football team was an American football team that represented Purdue University during the 1940 Big Ten Conference football season.  In their fourth season under head coach Allen Elward, the Boilermakers compiled a 2–6 record (1–4 record against conference opponents), finished in eighth place in the Big Ten Conference, and were outscored by opponents by a total of 106 to 96.

Schedule

References

Purdue
Purdue Boilermakers football seasons
Purdue Boilermakers football